In the Hindu epic Mahabharata, the wife of the warrior Karna is unnamed and in the Stri Parva of the epic, she is mentioned as the mother of Vrishasena and Sushena, the most prominent sons of Karna.

Karna's wives are subjects of fantasy and different stories and folktales portray different women as the wives of Karna. The Tamil play Karna Moksham portray Ponnuruvi as his wife, while the regional Kashidasi Mahabharata states her to be Padmavati. In many modern adaptations of the Mahabharata, Karna is married to two women—Vrushali and Supriya.

In the Mahabharata 
Karna's wives play insignificant roles in the original epic. In the Udyoga Parva of the Mahabharata, Karna—while explaining his commitment towards his foster parents—mentions them.

In the epic's Stri Parva, Gandhari, the mother of Duryodhana (antagonist of the Mahabharata), describes the grief of women after the  Kurukshetra War. The sorrow of a wife of Karna is also described by her.

In derivative literature

Vrushali 
The wife of Karna belonging to the Suta (charioteer) community is attested as Vrushali (also spelt as Vrishali) in the Marathi novels Radheya (by Ranjit Desai), and Mritunjaya (by Shivaji Sawant). The name becomes popular in recent times due to its mentions in many modern adaptations based on Karna's life. According to the tale, Vrushali was a good friend of Karna from their childhood. When Karna grew up, Adhiratha chose her as the bride for his son. She is described to be wise and pious. After the death of her sons and husband, she ended her life on her husband's pyre.

Supriya 
Supriya (Sanskrit: सुप्रिया) is considered as Karna's second wife, the first being Vrushali. According to scholar Pradip Bhattacharya, Supriya is a creation of Shivaji Sawant and her name parallels with Subhadra, the wife of Karna's rival Arjuna. In Mritunjaya, Supriya is the maid of Bhanumati, princess of Kalinga. When the King of Kalinga organises Bhanumati's swayamvara, Duryodhana abducts Bhanumati with the help of Karna and marries her. Duryodhana getsSupriya  married to Karna.

Padmavati
In the Kashidasi Mahabharat (the Bengali retelling of the epic), Padmavati is the wife of Karna. She was the maid of princess Asawari. They were rescued by Karna from some attackers. When Karna asks Asawari's father, the king, for her hand, the king rejected her marriage with Karna. Later, Karna attacked the kings at Asawari's swaymvara. Karna asked her if she would like to marry him. She says that she will do anything to save her father. Karna then accepts her maid Padmavati as his wife instead. Padmavati marries him and goes to Anga Kingdom with him.

Ponnuruvi
Ponnuruvi is the wife of Karna in the Karna Moksham of Kattaikkuttu, a Tamil drama written by Pukalentippulavar. She plays a major role in it and is depicted as a princess belonging to Kshatriya (warrior) community. In the play, she is the princess of Kalinga and the story of her marriage is based on the Mahabharata's narration of the abduction of the Kalinga princess. Though the princess marries Duryodhana in the original epic, in these folklores, she is named Ponnuruvi and is married to Karna because he was the one who touched her during the abduction. Karna Moksham depicts her as abusive towards Karna as his lineage is not specified and she believes him to be of the lower caste. She doesn't even let Karna touch his son. However, when Karna discloses his true lineage before going to the Kurukshetra War, her attitude drastically changes  and she apologizes. She advises Karna to not kill the Pandavas (Karna's half-brothers). She also advises him to leave the side of the Duryodhana. However, Karna refuses as believes Duryodhana to be his true friend. After Karna dies in the war, Ponnuruvi laments his death.

Reference

 Characters in the Mahabharata